Eftyhia Vardas FC Path is an honorary extra-ordinary professor in medical virology at the Department of Medical Virology, University of Stellenbosch, and head of virology at Lancet Laboratories in Johannesburg. She is a member of the COVID-19 Ministerial Advisory Committee to the South African minister of health.

Education
Vardas graduated from the University of the Witwatersrand (UoW) with a BSc in medical physiology and subsequently received her MBBCh, followed by DTM&H and DPH.

Career
She undertook her specialist training at the National Institutes of Communicable diseases in South Africa and also qualified as a fellow of the South African College of Pathologists in clinical virology. She gained a diploma in tropical medicine and hygiene, public health from the UoW and infectious disease modelling from the London School of Tropical Hygiene and Medicine.

Vardas is a member of the COVID-19 Ministerial Advisory Committee to the South African minister of health. She is an honorary extra-ordinary professor in medical virology at the Department of Medical Virology, University of Stellenbosch, and head of virology at Johannesburg's Lancet Laboratories, where, in November 2021, observations of a new SARS-CoV-2 virus led to the discovery of Omicron.

Her past research has included trials on developing therapeutic vaccines for HIV/AIDS, hepatitis B vaccines and human papilloma virus vaccines.

Other work
In 2009 she qualified for the diploma of Cape Wine Master with a dissertation titled "The fall and rise of Sémillon in South Africa".

Selected publications
 (Co-author)
 (Co-author)
 (Co-author)

References

External links 
Eftyhia Vardas Researchgate

Living people
Year of birth missing (living people)
Women virologists
Academic staff of Stellenbosch University
South African virologists
Zimbabwean emigrants to South Africa
University of the Witwatersrand alumni